Brandon Lamont Beach (born May 2, 1961) is an American politician serving as a member of the Georgia State Senate. Beach was first elected in the 2012 general election and serves Georgia's 21st district, which includes portions of Cherokee and Fulton counties.

Beach was involved with attempts to overturn the 2020 United States presidential election.

Early life and education
Born in Louisiana on May 2, 1961, Brandon Beach has an undergraduate degree from Louisiana State University (LSU) and a Master of Business Administration (MBA) from Centenary College. He is a former member of the Alpharetta City Council and the Alpharetta Planning and Zoning Commission. As of January 2013, Brandon Beach is the president and CEO of the North Fulton Chamber of Commerce.

Political career
Beach was elected in 2012 and sworn into the Georgia Senate in 2013. He sits on the Senate Economic Development, Government Oversight, Science and Technology, and currently serves as Chairman of the Transportation committee. Beach ran unopposed in 2020.

In 2019, Beach ran for the Republican nomination to challenge current Representative Lucy McBath in Georgia's 6th Congressional District.  On November 14, 2019, Beach withdrew from the race and announced he would seek reelection.

Role in attempts to overturn the 2020 presidential election
After Joe Biden won the 2020 presidential election in Georgia, Beach backed attempts to overturn the presidential vote in Georgia over baseless fraud allegations. Lt. Gov. Geoff Duncan subsequently stripped Beach of his chairmanship of the Transportation Committee. In July, 2022, Fulton County prosecutor Fani Willis announced that she had sent a target letter to Beach and two other Republican officials, warning them that they face indictment in connection with their role in the fake electors scheme, which was part of the attempts to overturn the 2020 United States presidential election.

Coronavirus exposure
Beach was confirmed to have COVID-19. He first showed symptoms on March 10, 2020, and was tested on March 14. In spite of showing symptoms, he attended a special session of the state Senate on March 16. The positive test results arrived on March 18. His actions led the entire Georgia State Senate, as well as staffers and others, to enter self-isolation and quarantine until the end of March 2020. Beach's failure to follow coronavirus protocols has angered many within the Georgia State Senate. Governor Brian Kemp stated that Beach's actions were a clear example of what not to do if you felt sick. Testing has confirmed at least four other members of the Senate with positive test results Beach has responded that he is "not a bad person", and that he thought it was bronchitis.

See also

 List of state government committees (Georgia)

References

External links
 Welcome to the Georgia General Assembly  Legis.ga.gov. Retrieved June 28, 2013.

|-

Centenary College of Louisiana alumni
Georgia (U.S. state) city council members
Republican Party Georgia (U.S. state) state senators
Living people
1961 births
Louisiana State University alumni
People from Alpharetta, Georgia
21st-century American politicians